Mehmet Ali Aybar (5 October 1908 – 10 July 1995) was a lawyer, member of the Turkish parliament, the second president of the Workers Party of Turkey ( or briefly TİP), the founder and President of the Socialist Revolution Party, and a member of the Russell Tribunal against the war crimes of the United States in Vietnam.

Biography
Mehmet Ali Aybar was born in Istanbul in 1908. He was a great-grandson of the Ottoman soldier Mehmed Ali Pasha, and thus a relative of Turkish poets Nâzım Hikmet and Oktay Rıfat Horozcu, as well as the statesman Ali Fuat Cebesoy. He studied at Galatasaray High School, and graduated from Istanbul University's School of Law.  He then moved to Paris to continue his legal studies. It was in Paris that he was exposed to Marxist literature. Upon returning to Istanbul he became assistant professor of international law at the same Law School he graduated from. His academic career was hampered by his communist leanings, and he was eventually expelled from the University in 1946. His writings for the Istanbul magazine Hür (Free) engendered anger on the part of the government and he was briefly imprisoned.

In 1950, Aybar was pardoned and began practicing law in Istanbul. He continued his activist writings and began participating in protests against the government, leading to his second arrest. After his release from prison in 1962, he became the first leader of the Workers' Party of Turkey. It was only after he ascended to party leadership that intellectuals began to take the party seriously. Aybar's credibility drew academics to the party As the leader of the party, he and his associates were responsible for the direction and success of the party. One of the primary tenets of the party was to resist Turkey's subservience to American influence. Aybar personally opposed the Soviet Union's invasion of Czechoslovakia and this caused disputes in the party. In 1971 he resigned from TİP as a result of his ideological split with party leadership over the Czechoslovakia issue. In 1975 he founded Socialist Party (later called Socialist Revolution Party). This party was closed by the military coup in 1980. Aybar was also a member of the International War Crimes Tribunal which was founded by Bertrand Russell. Mehmet Ali Aybar was born in Istanbul and died on 10 July 1995 in İstanbul.

Olympics

He participated in the 1928 Summer Olympics as track and field athlete for Turkey. He was eliminated in the first round of the 100 metres event. He was also a member of the Turkish team which was eliminated in the first round of the 4×100 metre relay competition.

Notes

References
 
 
 
 
 

1908 births
1995 deaths
Politicians from Istanbul
People from Constantinople vilayet
Workers' Party of Turkey politicians
Deputies of Istanbul
Leaders of political parties in Turkey
Sportspeople from Istanbul
Galatasaray athletes
Olympic athletes of Turkey
Athletes (track and field) at the 1928 Summer Olympics
Galatasaray High School alumni
Istanbul University Faculty of Law alumni
Recipients of Turkish presidential pardons
Turkish Marxists
Turkish male sprinters
Turkish sportsperson-politicians
Burials at Aşiyan Asri Cemetery
20th-century Turkish people